The torch relay for the 2008 Summer Paralympic Games was held between August 28 and September 6 in eleven cities, and also included the tomb of Yellow Emperor.

Planned Route 
In 2007, the Beijing Organizing Committee for the Olympic Games announced the torch relay route, composed of three parts:
 The route of the Paralympics Games Host Cities, which includes Vancouver and Whistler (the host cities of the 2010 Winter Paralympic Games), London (the host city of the 2012 Summer Paralympic Games), Sochi (the host city of the 2014 Winter Paralympic Games) and Hong Kong (the co-host NOC of the 2008 Summer Paralympics);
 The route of Modern China, which includes Beijing, Shenzhen, Chongqing, Wuhan, Shanghai, Qingdao, Dalian and Tianjin; and
 The route of Ancient China, which includes Beijing, Huangdiling (The Tomb of Yellow Emperor), Xi'an, Hohhot, Ürümqi, Chengdu, Changsha, Nanjing and Luoyang.

Change of the route
In June 2008, the Beijing Games' Organizing Committee announced that the planned four international torch relay cities and four national cities for the Paralympic Games had been cancelled. The Committee stated that the relay was being cancelled to enable the Chinese government to "focus on the rescue and relief work" following the Sichuan earthquake. The torch relay was held exclusively within China.

Despite the officially stated reason for the cancellation, The Guardian attributed it to China's wish to avoid "a repeat of the protests" which had occurred in a number of cities around the world during the Olympics torch relay. Similarly, The Times wrote: "China has cancelled the international leg of the Paralympic torch relay, which was due to pass through London, in an apparent attempt to avoid similar protests to those that dogged the Olympic torch’s global tour." Reuters reported simply: "China, whose Beijing Olympic torch relay was dogged by protest overseas, on Wednesday cancelled the international leg of the Paralympic torch relay, giving the devastating Sichuan earthquake as the reason."

The relay started from Tiantan on August 28 and then divided to two parallel lines before coming together in Beijing:

The route of Modern China
Beijing
Shenzhen
Wuhan
Shanghai
Qingdao
Dalian
Beijing

The route of Ancient China
Beijing
Xi'an
Hohhot
Changsha
Nanjing
Luoyang
Beijing

Lighting
Date: August 28, 2008
Place: Tiantan, Beijing, China
Host and hostess in post-ceremony and pre-ceremony: Pu Cunxin, Yang Lan
Host of the ceremony: Guo Jinlong, Mayor of Beijing, Executive President of the Beijing Organizing Committee for the Olympic Games
Speeches:
Deng Pufang, President of the Chinese Disabled Person's Association, Executive President of the Beijing Organizing Committee for the Olympic Games
Philip Craven, President of the International Paralympic Committee
Liu Qi, President of the Beijing Organizing Committee for the Olympic Games
Gather Flame: Jiang Xintian
Urn Holder: Jin Jing, a famous Paralympic athlete
Lighting the Flame: Liu Qi
Cauldron Lighter and Begin Announcer: Wen Jiabao, Premier of People's Republic of China

Relay Summary

Final Relay in Main Stadium
Chinese athletes with disabilities carried the torch in Beijing National Stadium during the Games' Opening Ceremony. Jin Jing carried the torch into the stadium, before it was passed on to Paralympic gold medallists Wu Yunhu, Zhang Hongwei, Zhang Haidong, Sun Changting and Hou Bin. Hou then pulled himself up on a rope to the top of the stadium to light the Paralympic flame.

See also 
 2008 Summer Olympics torch relay
 2010 Winter Paralympics torch relay
 2022 Winter Olympics torch relay
 2022 Winter Paralympics torch relay

References 

Torch relay
Paralympic torch relays